OpenProject is a free open-source web application for project collaboration.

OpenProject may also refer to:
 OpenProj, often called OpenProject, a free open source stand alone application for project planning, emulating MS Project
 OpenProject Foundation, the foundation for OpenProject, established 2012 in Berlin, Germany
 OpenProjectsFoundation, an open source software foundation, established 2007 in Sofia, Bulgaria